Volodymyr Koniev (born 18 June 1989) is a Ukrainian basketball player for BC Budivelnyk of the Ukrainian Basketball SuperLeague. He also represents the Ukraine national team.

He participated at the EuroBasket 2017.

References

External links
 realgm.com profile

1989 births
Living people
BC Cherkaski Mavpy players
BC Budivelnyk players
BC Pieno žvaigždės players
Small forwards
Sportspeople from Kharkiv
Ukrainian men's basketball players